The following lists events that happened during 2011 in Chile.

Incumbents
 President: Sebastián Piñera (RN)

Events

June
June 4 – Puyehue Volcano erupts forcing the evacuation of more than a thousand residents.

References

 
Years of the 21st century in Chile
2010s in Chile
Chile
Chile